

University Heights may refer to:

Places

United States
Towns or cities
University Heights, Iowa
University Heights, Ohio

Neighborhoods
University Heights, Albany, New York
University Heights, Austin, Texas
University Heights, Bronx, New York
University Heights, Buffalo, New York
University Heights, Cincinnati, Ohio
University Heights, Gainesville, Florida
University Heights, Indianapolis, Indiana
University Heights, Minot, North Dakota
University Heights, Newark, New Jersey
University Heights, San Bernardino, California
University Heights, San Diego, California
University Heights, Virginia, near Charlottesville, Virginia
University Heights (Washington, D.C.)

Transportation
The University Heights Bridge, connecting University Heights and Manhattan

College campuses once known as "University Heights"
Busch Campus (Rutgers University) in New Jersey
The defunct Bronx campus of New York University, now belonging to Bronx Community College

Places listed on the National Register of Historic Places
University Heights apartments (Tucson, Arizona)
University Heights Historic District (Madison, Wisconsin)
University Heights School (Seattle), King County, Washington
University Heights Subdivision Number One, St. Louis County, Missouri

Canada
Neighborhoods
University Heights, Calgary, Alberta
University Heights Development Area, Saskatoon, Saskatchewan
University Heights Suburban Centre, Saskatoon, Saskatchewan
University Heights, Toronto, Ontario

China
Neighborhoods
University Heights, Hong Kong
University Heights, Kotewall Road, Hong Kong

Other uses
University Heights (film)